Andoni Ugarte Mendizabal (born 5 April 1995) is a Spanish footballer who plays as a central defender for Sestao River.

Club career
Ugarte was born in Oñati, Gipuzkoa, Basque Country. A Real Sociedad youth graduate, he made his senior debut with the reserves on 5 January 2014, starting in a 0–3 Segunda División B away loss against CD Tudelano.

Ugarte was definitely promoted to the B-team on 11 July 2014, and scored his first senior goal on 15 November, in a 3–2 away defeat of SD Amorebieta. On 26 June 2018, after being released by the Txuri-urdin, he moved to another reserve team, Real Oviedo Vetusta also in the third division.

On 11 June 2019, Ugarte was one of seven players from the B-side who were promoted to Real Oviedo's first team for the 2019–20 Segunda División campaign.

On 11 June 2020, he joined to Primera División RFEF club Calahorra.

References

External links

1995 births
Living people
People from Oñati
Spanish footballers
Footballers from the Basque Country (autonomous community)
Association football defenders
Segunda División B players
Primera Federación players
Real Sociedad B footballers
Real Oviedo Vetusta players
CD Calahorra players
Sestao River footballers